Euchontha frigida is a moth of the family Notodontidae first described by Francis Walker in 1864. It is distributed along the eastern slope of the Andes from central Colombia south to Bolivia.

References

Moths described in 1864
Notodontidae of South America